Feria de Nîmes is a popular festival centered on Spanish-style bullfighting held each year in Nîmes, Southern France. In May 2012, the Feria celebrated its 60th anniversary.

References

Tourist attractions in Nîmes
Festivals in France
Annual events in France
Bullfighting in France